Denmark–Iceland relations are the foreign relations between Denmark and Iceland. Iceland was a Norwegian dependency since the Middle Ages and thus became part of the Kalmar Union and Denmark–Norway, both entities dominated by Denmark. After the dissolution of Denmark–Norway, Iceland was a part of the Kingdom of Denmark from 1814 to 1918 and a separate kingdom in a personal union with Denmark until 1944, when Iceland declared independence.

Both countries are full members of the Council of the Baltic Sea States, Nordic Council, NATO, and Council of Europe. There are around 18,000 Icelanders living in Denmark and 2,900 Danes living in Iceland.

The relationship between Iceland and Denmark remained close after Iceland's independence, and for many years Danish was taught as the second language in Iceland, and is still compulsory as a third language from seventh grade onward.

History

19th century
Iceland achieved home rule in 1874, and became a fully sovereign state in 1918, united with Denmark under a common King.
In 1814, following the Napoleonic Wars, Denmark-Norway was broken up into two separate kingdoms via the Treaty of Kiel. Iceland, however, remained a Danish dependency. Throughout the 19th century, the country's climate continued to worsen, resulting in mass emigration to the New World, particularly Manitoba in Canada. About 15,000 out of a total population of 70,000 left. However, a new national consciousness was revived, inspired by romantic and nationalist ideas from Continental Europe, and an Icelandic independence movement arose under the leadership of Jón Sigurðsson. In 1874, Denmark granted Iceland a constitution and limited home rule, which was expanded in 1904. The Icelanders abolished the monarchy in 1944.

20th century

The German occupation of Denmark on 9 April 1940 severed communications between Iceland and Denmark. As a result, on 10 April, the Parliament of Iceland, Alþingi, elected to take control of foreign affairs, electing a provisional governor, Sveinn Björnsson, who later became the republic's first president. During the first year of World War II, Iceland strictly enforced a position of neutrality, taking action against both the United Kingdom and German forces violating the laws of neutrality. On 10 May 1940, Operation Fork was launched and UK military forces began an invasion of Iceland by sailing into Reykjavík harbor. The government of Iceland issued a protest against what it called a "flagrant violation" of Icelandic neutrality. On the day of the invasion, prime minister Hermann Jónasson read a radio announcement telling Icelanders to treat the British troops with politeness as guests.

Following a referendum on 24 May 1944, Iceland formally became an independent republic on 17 June 1944. Since Denmark was still occupied by Nazi Germany, many Danes felt offended that the step should have been taken at this time. Despite this the Danish king, Christian X, sent a message of congratulations to the Icelandic people.

Resident diplomatic missions
 Denmark has an embassy in Reykjavík.
 Iceland has an embassy in Copenhagen and consulates-general in Nuuk, Greenland and in Tórshavn, Faroe Islands.

See also
 History of Iceland
 Icelanders
 Danes in Iceland
 Icelandics in Denmark

References

 
Iceland 
Bilateral relations of Iceland
Relations of colonizer and former colony